Pisidium pseudosphaerium is a species of freshwater bivalve from family Sphaeriidae.

Description
The 2.5-3.2mm shell is a flattened, regular, slightly angulated oval shape with low central umbos. The surface is silky with very fine concentric striations. In colour it is straw-yellow with scattered red-brown deposits.

Distribution
Its native distribution is central European and western European.

 Czech Republic - in Bohemia, in Moravia, critically endangered (CR)
 Germany - critically endangered (vom Aussterben bedroht) 
 Nordic countries: Denmark, Finland (near threatened), Norway and Sweden (not recorded in Faroes, Iceland)
Great Britain and Ireland

References

External links
Pisidium pseudosphaerium at Animalbase taxonomy,short description, biology,status (threats), images

pseudosphaerium
Bivalves described in 1927
Bivalves of Europe